Chloride channel accessory 4, also known as CLCA4, is a protein which in humans CLCA4 gene. The protein encoded by this gene is a chloride channel. Protein structure prediction methods suggest the N-terminal region of CLCA4 protein is a zinc metalloprotease, and the protein is not an ion channel per se.

See also
 Chloride channel

References

Further reading

External links
 
 

Chloride channels